Keren Or Synagogue is a Reform Jewish Synagogue which serves as the synagogue for the Liberal Jewish Community of Lyon. It is located at 15 Rue Jules Vallès in Villeurbanne.

History 
In 1981 the Liberal Israelite Community of Lyon (Communauté libérale israélite de Lyon (CLIL)) was founded. It closed four years later in 1985. In 1990, the community was relaunched as a Reform community, taking the name the Liberal Jewish Community (Communauté juive libérale (CJL)). It was supported by Rabbi François GaraÏ of the Liberal Jewish Community of Geneva and Rabbi Daniel Farhi of the Mouvement juif libéral de France. In September 2001, the synagogue hired its first Rabbi and by 2002 had nearly 180 families and was holding services at 7 quai Jean-Moulin.

In 2012, the community merged with the Liberal Jewish Union of Lyon (l'Union juive libérale de Lyon (UJLL)) and the synagogue was renamed Keren Or, (Hebrew: קרן אור, "Ray of Light"). In September 2015, the synagogue moved to its current location on rue Jules Vallès in Villeurbanne. Their Rabbis include René Pfertzel, installed as the synagogue's rabbi in December 2017,  Haïm Casas (born 1981), a Sephardic Jew from Cordoba, Spain,. In July 2019 he was joined by Rabbi Daniela Touati (born 1966), an Ashkenazi Jew from Romania who was ordained on July 7, 2019 at West London Synagogue following her studies at Leo Baeck College in London.

The community celebrated its thirtieth anniversary in 2020 and views itself as a modern, inclusive congregation. It supports gender equality, and is open to interfaith dialogue. The synagogue focuses on study of the Talmud Torah, along with contemporary research on historical criticism of the Bible.

References

See also 

 Reform Judaism
 World Union for Progressive Judaism

External links 

 

Reform synagogues in France
Buildings and structures in Lyon
1990 establishments in France
Synagogues in France